Babine Portage, British Columbia (population ~13) is a locality in located about 12 km north of the Portage Yekooche First Nation Reserve along a gravel road, on the west end of Babine Lake, in Central British Columbia, part of traditional Babine territory. Its elevation is 782 m. (2565 ft).

Although people from Tache, Fort St. James, and Prince George visit the area, it is mostly used by members of Yekooche First Nation who spend most of the summer there before returning to Portage Reserve in the fall. The lake provides them with salmon and kokanee, while moose, deer and bear hunting can be done nearby around Salt Lake, Frank's Meadow, and a lagoon west of the camp. Frank's Meadow was likely named after a hermit named Frank who inhabited the area. People also fish at 4 Mile and 6 Mile Creek, east of the camp near Quarter Island. People from Yekooche rely on their catch from Babine Portage for winter food.

History
The name originates from the 19th century, when the site was used as an entry point for canoes portaging to the Hudson's Bay Company post.

In the past, there were five cabins on the east side of the creek and seven on the west side, but in 2003, all but three were ignited by grass fires and burned down. The cabins on the west side of the creek were used by the Yekooche Indians during the summer hunting and salmon catching season. On the east side of the creek, one of the cabins was the original built by the Hudson's Bay Company while the 4 others belonged to Joseph Chase Ells and Company during the second half of the 20th century.

Culture
An important local tradition at Babine Portage involves t'es'ing up first-time visitors, which means to rub coal on their cheeks to ward off bad weather at the camp.

References

Wet'suwet'en